Oaks is a rural locality in the local government area (LGA) of Meander Valley in the Launceston LGA region of Tasmania, Australia. The 2016 census recorded a population of 36 for the state suburb of Oaks.

History 
Oaks was gazetted as a locality in 1968.

Geography
The Liffey River forms the eastern boundary. The Western Railway Line passes through from east to west.

Road infrastructure 
Route C511 (Oaks Road) passes through from north to south.

References

Towns in Tasmania
Localities of Meander Valley Council